Fowler's Folly, built during 1848-1853, was the octagonal home of Orson S. Fowler in Fishkill, New York. It was a "monumental" house for its time, with four stories and 60 rooms. The house was condemned as a public health hazard and dynamited in 1897.

Orson Squire Fowler was author of a book, The Octagon House: A House for All, that was first published in 1848. The book, frequently mischaracterized as a pattern book, ignited a fad for octagon houses in the United States and perhaps also in Canada.

See also
List of octagon houses

References

Octagon houses in New York (state)
Fishkill, New York